Casalnuovo ("New Casale") is the name of several places in Italy:

 Casalnuovo di Napoli, a municipality of the Province of Naples, Campania
 Casalnuovo Monterotaro, a municipality of the Province of Foggia, Apulia
 Casalbuono, a municipality of the Province of Salerno, Campania; known as Casalnuovo until 1862
 Cittanova, a comune (municipality) in the Metropolitan City of Reggio Calabria; known as Casalnuovo until 1852
 Basicò, a comune (municipality) in the Metropolitan City of Messina, Sicily; known as Casalnuovo until 1862